Sir John Knewstub Maurice Rothenstein  (11 July 1901 – 27 February 1992) was a British arts administrator and art historian.

Biography
John Rothenstein was born in London in 1901, the son of Sir William Rothenstein. The family was connected to the Bloomsbury Set. John Rothenstein studied at Worcester College, Oxford, and became friends with T. E. Lawrence. He shared rooms with novelist William Gerhardie.

After serving as Director of Leeds City Art Gallery, he was appointed Director of Sheffield City Art Galleries (1932-38) where he oversaw the establishment and opening of the Graves Art Gallery. From 1938–64 Rothenstein was Director of the Tate Gallery in London. Hs father had been a trustee of the Tate up until a few years before and there were hints of nepotism in the appointment, especially as his father had telephoned the Chairman of the trustees in advance of Rothenstein's job interview.

Rothenstein's directorship — the longest to date — was one of the most successful. The Tate's annual purchase fund could not compete with those of US institutions, so few works of modern foreign art were added to the collection. However, he wrote, "Picasso is a Proteus, the prodigiously gifted master of all styles and media".

According to Richard Cork, one of Rothenstein's errors was failing to purchase Henri Matisse's The Red Studio when it was offered to the Tate Gallery for a few hundred pounds in 1941.

Art historian Douglas Cooper began an open campaign to have Rothenstein dismissed by the trustees, which led to an incident in which Rothenstein punched Cooper in the face in 1954, knocking his glasses off.

Rothenstein documented the lives of all the major (and many still overlooked) British artists in his Modern English Painters, which has earned him the title of 'The Vasari of British Art' (like Vasari's pioneering Lives, it was revised and reprinted during the author's lifetime). 

The Tate began hosting temporary exhibitions during this period, organised by the Arts Council of Great Britain, including the major 1960 retrospective of Picasso. Rothenstein acquired such contemporary works as R.B. Kitaj's Isaac Babel Riding with Budyonny from the artist's first major show at Marlborough Fine Art in 1963.
In 1964 he retired from the Tate to Oxfordshire where he wrote three volumes of autobiography.

An annual lecture named in his honour now takes place at Tate Britain.

Honours
Rothenstein was appointed Commander of the Order of the British Empire (CBE) in the 1948 King's Birthday Honours, and knighted in the 1952 New Year Honours.

On 19 February 1965 he was installed as the Rector of the University of St Andrews and received an honorary Doctor of Laws.

Works
 The Life and Death of Conder (1938) J. M. Dent & Sons Ltd. London
 Modern English Painters (3 vols., 1952–74)
 The Tate Gallery, 'The World of Art Library' series. Thames & Hudson (1962)
 Autobiography: Summer's Lease, 1901-1938 (1965); Bright Day, Hideous Night, 1939-1965 (1966)
 The Artists of the 1890's (1928) George Routledge & Sons Ltd. London

References

External links

William Roberts's pamphlet attacking Rothenstein's coverage of him in Modern English Painters; accessed 28 July 2014.
Spalding, Frances, "John Rothenstein’s turbulent time at the Tate," Apollo, 26 October 2018. (Review of Clark, Adrian, Fighting On All Fronts: John Rothenstein in the Art World, London, UK: Unicorn Publishing Group, 2018.)

1901 births
1992 deaths
British art historians
British curators
Directors of the Tate galleries
Commanders of the Order of the British Empire
Alumni of Worcester College, Oxford
Knights Bachelor
People educated at Bedales School
Rectors of the University of St Andrews
20th-century British historians